The Scenic West Athletic Conference (also known as the Scenic West Conference) is a sports association for junior colleges located in Idaho, Utah, Colorado, Nevada, and California.  The conference is a member of the NJCAA and sponsors 9 sports, 4 for men and 5 for women. It is the sole conference in the NJCAA's Region 18.

History
The origins of the Scenic West started in 1986, as the nine schools in the region resumed round-robin competition after discontinuing it in 1985. Salt Lake Community College began play in 1987, and the conference adopted its current name in 1990.

Region 18 itself was formed in 1968, as Idaho, Montana, Oregon, and Washington were split off from Arizona, California, Nevada, and Utah, which remained in the NJCAA's Region 1. When almost all of the Oregon and Washington schools left the NJCAA to form the Northwest Athletic Association of Community Colleges (now NWAC) in 1983, the next year Nevada, Utah, and far western Colorado were added to Region 18 to keep the region feasible. This year brought the initial round-robin schedule, but the next year the addition of Flathead Community College of Montana caused that schedule to be dropped. This was short-lived, as Flathead's team disbanded during the season, and the remaining regional schools joined to form the current Scenic West.

Member schools

 known as College of Eastern Utah until 2010.

Former members

Scenic West

Schools leaving before Region 18 became the NWAC

Region 18 Divisions
1968-69

1969-70

1970-71

1971-74

1974-76

1976-78

1978-79

1979-81

1981-83

Post-NWAACC Alignments

Sponsored sports (men)
Basketball
Baseball – uses wooden bats in conference play
Golf
Wrestling
Soccer

Sponsored sports (women)
Basketball
Golf
Soccer
Softball
Volleyball

References

Northwest Athletic Association of Community Colleges
NWAACC Men's Basketball Past Standings

External links
Scenic West Athletic Conference